Henry Crocheron (December 26, 1772 – November 8, 1819) was a U.S. Representative from New York, brother of Jacob Crocheron.

Born on Staten Island, Richmond County, New York, Crocheron attended the common schools.
He engaged in mercantile pursuits in Northfield. He was the Supervisor of Northfield from 1808 to 1814.

Crocheron was elected as a Democratic-Republican  to the Fourteenth Congress (March 4, 1815 – March 4, 1817).
He served as captain of militia in 1818.
He died in New Springville neighborhood of Staten Island on November 8, 1819.
He was interred in St. Andrew's Churchyard, Richmond County, Staten Island, New York.

References

1772 births
1819 deaths
People from Staten Island
Democratic-Republican Party members of the United States House of Representatives from New York (state)